Šentlovrenc ( or ) is a village on the Temenica River in the Municipality of Trebnje in eastern Slovenia. The area is part of the historical Lower Carniola region. The municipality is now included in the Southeast Slovenia Statistical Region.

Church

The local parish church from which the settlement gets its name is dedicated to Saint Lawrence and belongs to the Roman Catholic Diocese of Novo Mesto. It was first mentioned in written documents dating to 1177, but the current building is a result of various extensive rebuilding stages, most recently in the 19th century.

References

External links
Šentlovrenc at Geopedia

Populated places in the Municipality of Trebnje